Evan Buliung is a Canadian actor. He has played roles on stage and in musical theatre, including the role of Aragorn in the Toronto production of Lord of the Rings, Khashoggi in We Will Rock You, William Burke in Bloodless: The Trial of Burke and Hare and Pericles in the Stratford Festival's 2015 production of The Adventures of Pericles.

Career 
Buliung played the lead role of Joe Schofield in the Royal Manitoba Theatre Centre/Canadian Stage production of Chimerica in 2016.

He has also had occasional supporting roles in film and television, most notably as Professor Warren in The Best Years, Michael Braxton in Bitten and Robert Hobbie in Holly Hobbie. Evan also gave his voice to various video game characters, his most famous work is portrayal of Holden Cross and his multiplayer counterpart Lawbringer in For Honor in 2017. He later reprised his role as a stand-alone DLC character, Gryphon, in 2020.

He was a Dora Mavor Moore Award nominee for Best Actor in a Musical in 2013 for Bloodless, and was a Canadian Screen Award nominee for Best Lead Actor in a Television Film or Miniseries at the 5th Canadian Screen Awards in 2017 for CBC Television's film of Pericles.

Filmography

Film

Television

References

External links
 

Canadian male stage actors
Canadian male television actors
Canadian male film actors
Canadian male voice actors
Canadian male musical theatre actors
Place of birth missing (living people)
Year of birth missing (living people)
Living people
Canadian male Shakespearean actors
Dora Mavor Moore Award winners